Ixtepec may refer to:

  Mexico:
 Ixtepec, Oaxaca
 Ixtepec, Puebla

 Other
 "Ixtepec", a song by Mexican rock band Café Tacuba from their album Re.